Norman Tyrrell (1897–1948) was a British sculptor. His work was part of the sculpture event in the art competition at the 1948 Summer Olympics.

References

External links
 

1897 births
1948 deaths
20th-century British sculptors
20th-century British male artists
British male sculptors
Olympic competitors in art competitions
Sculptors from London